Harold Fabián Preciado Villarreal (born 1 June 1994) is a Colombian professional footballer who plays as a forward for Liga MX team Santos Laguna.

Club career
Harold Preciado would start his senior career with top tier club Deportivo Cali in the 2013 Categoría Primera A season. The following season he was loaned out to second tier club Jaguares de Córdoba where he immediately established himself as a vital member of their team, going on to win the division title and promotion with them. This saw Deportivo Cali incorporate Harold back into the team and he would immediately repay them by winning the 2015 Categoría Primera A: Apertura for them.

On 7 February 2017, Harold joined second tier Chinese football club Shenzhen for the start of the 2017 China League One campaign. In his debut appearance he would score a hat-trick on 12 March 2017 against Dalian Transcendence F.C. in a league game that ended in a 6-0 victory. At the end of the campaign he would personally be the top goalscorer in the division. The following season he was able to maintain his form and go on to gain promotion with Shenzhen to the top tier at the end of the 2018 China League One campaign.

On 29 January 2022 it was confirmed by Mexican team Santos Laguna that Preciado had signed with them.

International career
Preciado was named in Colombia's provisional squad for Copa América Centenario but was cut from the final squad. Preciado played a vital role in Colombia's qualification to the Olympics and played every game in the Rio olympics.

Preciado made his debut for the senior national team on 16 January 2022 in a 2–1 home win over Honduras.

Career statistics

Honours

Club 
Deportivo Cali
 Categoría Primera A: 2015–I, 2021–II

Jaguares de Córdoba
 Categoría Primera B: 2014

Individual 
 China League One top goalscorer: 2017

References

External links 

 

1994 births
Living people
Colombian footballers
Categoría Primera A players
Categoría Primera B players
China League One players
Chinese Super League players
Liga MX players
Deportivo Cali footballers
Jaguares de Córdoba footballers
Shenzhen F.C. players
Santos Laguna footballers
Footballers at the 2016 Summer Olympics
Olympic footballers of Colombia
People from Tumaco
Association football forwards
Colombian expatriate footballers
Expatriate footballers in China
Colombian expatriate sportspeople in China
Expatriate footballers in Mexico
Colombian expatriate sportspeople in Mexico
Sportspeople from Nariño Department